Thomas Jones House may refer to:

Thomas W. Jones House, Stoneham, Massachusetts, listed on the National Register of Historic Places (NRHP)
Tom Jones Ranch, Midland, South Dakota, listed on the NRHP in Jackson County, South Dakota
Thomas Jones House (Beaver, Utah), listed on the NRHP in Beaver County, Utah

See also
Jones House (disambiguation)